Lukas Doudera (born January 3, 1998) is a Czech ice hockey defenceman. He is currently playing with HC Litvínov of the Czech Extraliga.

Doudera made his Czech Extraliga debut with HC Oceláři Třinec during the 2014–15 Czech Extraliga season and stayed with the club for three seasons.

References

External links
 
 

1998 births
Living people
Czech ice hockey defencemen
HC Litvínov players
HC Oceláři Třinec players
Sportspeople from Kladno